Steve Colpaert (born 13 September 1986) is a Belgian former international footballer who played professionally as a defender. He has played for Eendracht Aalst since 2020.

Career
Born in Etterbeek, Colpaert began his senior career during the 2003-04 season with FC Brussels, before moving to Zulte Waregem in 2008. In 2020 he signed for Eendracht Aalst.

Colpaert represented Belgium at the 2007 UEFA European Under-21 Football Championship, and made his full international debut in 2010.

References

External links
 
 

1986 births
Living people
Belgian footballers
Belgium international footballers
Belgium youth international footballers
Belgium under-21 international footballers
Belgian Pro League players
Challenger Pro League players
R.W.D.M. Brussels F.C. players
S.V. Zulte Waregem players
Royal Antwerp F.C. players
People from Etterbeek
Association football defenders
S.C. Eendracht Aalst players
Footballers from Brussels